Marty Nanne (born July 21, 1967) is an American former professional ice hockey player. He is currently an amateur scout within the Minnesota Wild organization of the National Hockey League. Nanne was selected by the Chicago Blackhawks in the 8th round (161st overall) of the 1986 NHL Entry Draft.

He is the son of long-time NHL general manager Lou Nanne, and the father of Louie Nanne (born June 18, 1994), who was the 7th round pick of the  Minnesota Wild in the 2012 NHL Entry Draft.

Nanne played three seasons (1988-1991) in the International Hockey League with the Saginaw Hawks and the Indianapolis Ice, registering 10 goals, 32 points, and 111 penalty minutes in 109 professional games played.

References

External links

1967 births
American men's ice hockey right wingers
Chicago Blackhawks draft picks
Ice hockey people from Minnesota
Indianapolis Ice players
Living people
Minnesota Golden Gophers men's ice hockey players
Minnesota Wild scouts
Saginaw Hawks players
Sportspeople from Edina, Minnesota
Ice hockey players from Minnesota